Saved by the Bell is an American sitcom developed by Tracey Wigfield that premiered on November 25, 2020, on Peacock. It is a revival to the original television series of the same name created by Sam Bobrick and follows some of the same characters.

The entire main cast from the original Saved by the Bell reprised their roles in the revival, except for Dustin Diamond and Dennis Haskins as Screech and Mr. Belding, respectively. The series received generally positive reviews from critics, with praises going towards the performances of Hoog and Totah.

In January 2021, the series was renewed for a 10-episode second season which was released on November 24, 2021. In May 2022, the series was canceled after two seasons.

Plot
Set 26 years after Zach and Kelly's wedding, This higly anticipated reimagining of the beloved Saturday Morning TV series, follows the tight knit iconic gang of friends, now in their late 40s, are reunited and trying to navigate their lives. All the while, a new generation of students from California's affluent & working class communites enter the iconic high school, but conflict arises as they are forced to share the school after Zach Morris, now a California governor  shut down all the low income high schools in the impoverished districts and transferred the less fortunate students to wealthier and more high preforming schools in the state's richer areas.

Cast

Main

 Haskiri Velazquez as Daisy Jiménez, a smart, ambitious, and underprivileged sophomore who is excited at the prospect of attending Bayside High after her local school gets shut down
 Mitchell Hoog as Mac Morris, the handsome, charming, privileged son of Governor Zack Morris and Kelly Kapowski-Morris
 Josie Totah as Lexi Haddad-DeFabrizio, a sharp-tongued transgender cheerleader who has her own reality show
 Alycia Pascual-Peña as Aisha Garcia, Daisy's fun-loving but ultracompetitive best friend and Bayside High's new starting quarterback
 Belmont Cameli as Jamie Spano, the not-so-bright captain of the Bayside football team and Jessie's sensitive man-child son
 Dexter Darden as Devante Young, a new student at Bayside who has a love for high school musicals
 John Michael Higgins as Principal Ronald Toddman, who took over Mr. Belding's role as the head of Bayside High. He originally attended Bayside High along with the original gang, even if none of them (apart from Lisa) remembers him.
 Elizabeth Berkley Lauren as Jessie Spano, Jamie's mother and a school counselor at Bayside High. She has a Ph.D. in Educational Psychology, she's a New York Times best-selling author of parenting books, she gave TED Talks and was involved in politics. She is married to her struggling writer husband, René.
 Mario Lopez as A.C. Slater, a physical education teacher and football coach at Bayside High

Recurring
 Mark-Paul Gosselaar as Zack Morris, a former Bayside High student who is now former Governor of California and Mac's father He admittedly ran for governor as a way to get out of a $75 parking ticket and he later cut $10 billion in education funding from the state budget, which forces the closure of poorly funded schools, including Douglas High. He is married to his high school sweetheart Kelly Kapowski.
 Tiffani Thiessen as Kelly Morris, Mac's mother, Zack Morris' wife, and the First Lady of California. Zack and Kelly appear (uncredited) in the first, eighth and tenth episodes of the first season.
 Lark Voorhies as Lisa Turtle, a fashion designer and former Bayside High student who now lives and works between Los Angeles and Paris
 Ed Alonzo as Max, a magician and the owner of The Max
 Tricia O'Kelley as Jade Huntington-Snell, a member of the Bayside PTA who advocates for the Douglas High kids to leave Bayside
 DeShawn Cavanaugh as Colt Cassidy, Jamie's friend who's also on the Bayside High football team
 Abraham Rodriguez as Spencer Buckley, one of the students at Bayside High
 Mariah Iman Wilson as Nadia, one of the students at Bayside High. Devante has a crush on her.
 Kellen Joseph as The Fish, star wrestler at Bayside High. 
 Corey Michael Bangi as Mason, one of the students at Bayside High
 Brandon Marcel as Greg, one of the students at Bayside high
 Cheyenne Jackson as René, Jessie's estranged husband and Jamie's father who is a struggling writer
 Patrick Thomas O'Brien as Mr. Dewey, the Bayside High math teacher from the original series
 Matthew Sato as Gil Vatooley (season 2), Daisy's love interest
 Ariela Barer as Chloe (season 2), Aisha's love interest

Guest
 Selenis Leyva as Ms. Jimenez, Daisy's hardworking mother
 Courtney Lopez as Michelle, a woman whom Slater meets on a blind date and later starts dating

Episodes

Series overview

Season 1 (2020)

Season 2 (2021)

Production

Development
On September 17, 2019, it was announced that a single-camera revival of the series was in development for NBC's planned streaming service, Peacock, with Tracey Wigfield serving as showrunner. Wigfield would also executive produce the show alongside Franco Bario and Peter Engel, producer and executive producer of the original series, respectively. Funny or Dies Dashiell Driscoll, the executive producer of the web-series Zack Morris Is Trash, was hired as a staff writer for the show, along with 50 Centrals Shantira Jackson, among others. On January 19, 2021, Peacock renewed the series for a 10-episode second season. On May 4, 2022, Peacock canceled the series after two seasons.

Writing
Executive producer and showrunner Tracey Wigfield developed the idea alongside Berkley and Lopez, who joined the show also as producers. Wigfield called it “a reimagining” of the original series, not a reboot. “While the original show was a Saturday morning show for kids, this is a single-camera, kind of edgier comedy. If you never saw the (original), it's just a funny show about high school in 2020”.

Berkley noted that the new series would “maintain that heart with all of the humor”, appealing to both the new generation and the original fans. In order to maintain consistency with the original series, “time-outs” were included in the plot, along with fourth wall breaks, other Easter eggs and in-jokes. Wigfield encouraged her staff to watch the old episodes and "think about them through a 2020 lens." Due to his knowledge of the original show's storylines, writer Dashiell Driscoll was often the writers' room's advisor regarding trivia and story consistency.

Lopez stated that the way writers had set the characters to where they are now “was pretty clever”. According to Wigfield, Berkley was "very smartly protective of Jessie" in the way the character was conceived in the new series. "I wanted to remain true to the fact that Jessie was a bit ahead of her time. So I wanted to make sure that when we reconnected with her we understood what she actually has accomplished" Mark-Paul Gosselaar publicly appreciated the fact that new Zack was "a little offensive and sort of not being on the right side of things". 
The character of Mr. Toddman was written as a principal “constantly being pranked by his privileged students and yelled at by their entitled parents” but gets a second chance to make a difference when Bayside High “gets an influx of new, low-income students.”

When Wigfield approached transgender actress Josie Totah to play transgender cheerleader Lexi, she offered the actress a producing credit in order for her to have a voice in the writing process. 
"The more we got to talking about the character and her storyline, specifically her gender identity, it became clear to me that if I was going to do the show, I needed to have more stake in it. I was so grateful that Universal and [showrunner] Tracey Wigfield really championed me and allowed me to be a producer on this project because I didn't feel comfortable doing a show that explored my character's gender identity if representation didn't exist".

The production shutdown caused by the COVID-19 pandemic forced the writers to change the three remaining teleplays and to simplify some details in order for the shooting to be viable for the new protocols. The writing team was reassembled for a couple of weeks in August and, according to Wigfield, most of the changes "was just stuff that we had to simplify or we couldn't shoot at the school anymore. Anything that took place at the gym or in the theater, or anything else in an actual school, we had to move to the lot. So we had to make some changes there." A reference to the coronavirus was also added.

Casting
Elizabeth Berkley and Mario Lopez were initially announced as the only cast members of the original series to be reprising their roles and it was reported that they would also serve as producers on the show. Mark-Paul Gosselaar confirmed at the time that neither he nor his former co-star, Tiffani Thiessen had been officially approached.

On December 17, 2019, it was reported that John Michael Higgins had signed on to play Mr. Toddman, Bayside High's newest principal. On January 6, 2020, The Hollywood Reporter reported that 18-year-old actress Josie Totah had joined the cast of the comedy as Lexi and that she would also be credited as a producer on the show. On January 24, 2020, Deadline announced that Dexter Darden had joined the cast as well in an undisclosed role and on January 27, Haskiri Velazquez, Mitchell Hoog, Alycia Pascual-Pena and Belmont Cameli were announced.

In January 2020, it was confirmed that Mark-Paul Gosselaar would also be returning but only for three episodes due to his commitment as a series regular on ABC's Mixed-ish. It was reported that Gosselaar would also be serving as an executive producer. In March 2020, Gosselaar also confirmed that Tiffani Thiessen would be reprising her role in one episode. Thiessen later ended up appearing in three episodes of the first season. Both Gosselaar and Thiessen decided to go "unbilled" for their acting work and were merely credited as producers.

In early 2020, Lark Voorhies explained that she was not initially invited to be part of the show's reunion as well as other cast members events while appearing on television for the first time in years on The Dr. Oz Show to discuss her mental health issues. During an interview in September 2020, Lopez stated that Voorhies would indeed be guest-starring as Lisa Turtle, and NBC officially announced Voorhies' involvement with the series the following month.

Allegedly, Dustin Diamond publicly expressed disappointment for not being invited to reprise his role of Screech Powers in the new series, as the only cast member who had been featured as a leading character in every previous incarnation of Saved by the Bell. The character of Screech, however, was referenced throughout the show's first season. Tracey Wigfield stated that the role of Screech, despite being mentioned, "wasn't tied to any of the new characters or anything" in the first season but that the door was open for Diamond to appear in future seasons. Diamond died on February 1, 2021, after having revealed he had small-cell lung carcinoma just a few weeks earlier, precluding any future appearances.

In November 2020, it was announced that Dennis Haskins would not be reprising the role of Mr. Belding in the first season of the new series.

Actors Troy Fromin and Matt Kaminsky, who had appeared in the original show as Ox and Russian chess player Peter Breschnev respectively, made brief appearances as different characters: Fromin played the second man in line in the episode All in the Hall, while Kaminsky appeared as a delivery man in The Bayside Triangle. Rich Eames and Scott Gale, the music composers of the original show, made a cameo appearance together as part of the Birchwood Boys band.

Filming
Due to their involvement as producers during the pre-production process, both Mario Lopez and Elizabeth Berkley had to cancel their appearances at the Steel City Con in Monroeville, Pennsylvania, originally scheduled on December 7–8.

The first table read was held at Universal Studios on December 17, 2019, as announced by both Berkley and Lopez on their Instagram accounts. Throughout pre-production, DVDs of the original series were available in the production office for the young actors to watch, if needed.

Filming officially began on January 10, 2020, with Lopez giving fans a first look of the new series with a video of Berkley, Ed Alonzo and himself shooting their first scene at The Max diner, built at Universal Studios. The pilot, shot in 7 days, wrapped on January 20.
Unlike the original series (that was almost-completely directed by one single helmer, Don Barnhart), the new show was scheduled to be directed by different directors for different episodes. Primetime Emmy-winner Kabir Akhtar, Academy Award-winner Matthew A. Cherry and Daniella Eisman were among the new directors hired to helm each episode. The series was shot using single-camera setup and without a live studio audience, unlike the original, multi-camera sitcom.

Since the original sketches were lost, production designer Joseph Lucky had to use screenshots and pictures as references in order to recreate the iconic original sets, including the school's hallway, Mr. Belding's office and The Max. "Trying to mimic someone else's work isn't as easy as it seems, so the challenge there for me was to actually get it right and then to put my touches on it", Lucky said to Variety. For the textures and design elements of the new sets, Lucky took inspiration from Piet Mondrian's work "for additional flare" and the red color of the lockers (originally used only in the first two seasons of the show) was chosen to complement the maroon in the Bayside logo. Exterior scenes were shot in several locations in Burbank and Los Angeles, including the Universal Studios backlot.

On March 13, 2020, production was halted due to the COVID-19 pandemic in the United States during the pre-production of episode 1.08, before Gosselaar, Thiessen and Voorhies could film their scenes. With three episodes left to be filmed, the series eventually resumed production on August 17 and wrapped five weeks later, in mid-September 2020.

On May 4, 2021, Mario Lopez told Yahoo! Entertainment that the show's second season would feature a tribute to Dustin Diamond, saying: “We’re planning something special we haven’t gotten into yet.”
After a series of virtual table readings, filming for Season 2 officially began on Monday, June 7, 2021, at Universal Studios, as shared by Lopez and Elizabeth Berkley in their social media.

Release
The show was originally set to be released over the summer. When production for the last three episodes were delayed amid the COVID-19 pandemic, the release date was pushed back to November 25, 2020. All ten episodes were released exclusively on Peacock Premium, with only the pilot being available to stream for free in the platform. The second season was released on November 24, 2021.

Marketing
On April 15, 2020, Peacock released the first official teaser for the series, featuring scenes from the first seven episodes of the show It was followed by a second teaser launched on August 10, 2020. On October 27, 2020, an official trailer featuring Gosselaar and Thiessen was released. Two days later, Peacock released a first-look promotional still of Lark Voorhies back in character.

On July 29, 2020, Mark-Paul Gosselaar and Dashiell Driscoll launched Zack to the Future, a weekly podcast available on Apple Podcasts, Spotify, Entercom's Radio.com and other platforms. Every week, Gosselaar and Driscoll dissected one episode from the original series' first run, "analyzing iconic show moments and discussing “never-before-heard stories” from the set with featured guests". Elizabeth Berkley, Mario Lopez, Tiffani Thiessen, Breckin Meyer, Ed Alonzo, Bennett Tramer (writer of the original series) along with Allyson Thurston and Jennifer Schelling (who played the Zeffirelli Twins from 1989 until 1991) were among the special guest stars of the podcast.

On November 15, Elizabeth Berkley and Mario Lopez were presenters at the 46th People's Choice Awards ceremony, where host Demi Lovato dubbed their appearance "a Saved by the Bell reunion". The Los Angeles Times described their moment as a "must-see", also because award receiver Jimmy Fallon gave his acceptance speech on mute via Zoom. On November 16, Peacock launched a free Saved by the Bell channel including the original series, the two TV movies Saved by the Bell: Hawaiian Style and Saved by the Bell: Wedding in Las Vegas and the spin-off series Saved by the Bell: The College Years. The following day, the main cast described their feelings on returning to Bayside High in a featurette video exclusively debuted by People'''s official website. In the video, actor Dexter Darden made it clear that there were "no laugh tracks" in the new show. On November 18, Peacock unveiled the new theme song, an updated version of the original one performed by rapper Lil Yachty.

On November 25, the day the show premiered, original cast members Elizabeth Berkley, Mario Lopez, Mark-Paul Gosselaar and Tiffani Thiessen were guests on The Tonight Show Starring Jimmy Fallon.

A three-day marathon of the original episodes aired on E! starting on Friday, December 11 at 12 p.m. The marathon included the U.S. television premiere of the new show's pilot, that aired on December 13 at 9 p.m.

Reception
Critical response
For the series, review aggregator Rotten Tomatoes reported an approval rating of 76% based on 42 critic reviews, with an average rating of 6.9/10.The website's critical consensus reads, "Though the intended grade isn't always clear, Saved By The Bell’s capable cast of newcomers make Bayside's halls their own in a reboot that's smart, self-aware, and seriously funny." Metacritic gave the series a weighted average score of 71 out of 100 based on 16 critic reviews, indicating "generally favorable reviews".

Several critics were given three non-sequential episodes to review, including the pilot. Jen Chaney of Vulture gave the series a positive review, dubbing it "a self-aware satirical delight" and described the pilot as "the strongest first episode of a comedy I’ve seen all year." She also appreciated the "charming" new cast and complimented Hoog's "particularly strong" performance and the work of "the reliable great John Michael Higgins." According to Variety’s Amber Dowling, the show was a "pleasant surprise" led by a "brilliant young cast". She applauded showrunner Wigfield and the writing team for "masterfully" weaving all the best elements of the original show into the new series and was impressed by the trans character Lexi, "whose history is explained but never told through the filtered lens of trans struggle. It's a significant portrayal that pushes the conversation beyond gender identity". David Betancourt of the Washington Post gave the show a positive review, noting that it had "a big advantage over other reboots [being] really good". Describing the series as "a funnier and more culturally relevant reimagining of Bayside High", Betancourt applauded it for its "standout cast of young newcomers", especially the "much needed Afro-Latina representation" personified by Haskiri Velazquez and Alycia Pascual-Peña. "Having these chicas take center stage in a new SBTB world matters". Josh Sorokach of Decider described the series as "an irreverent, immensely enjoyable blast from the past, but also a worthy successor to the original series" and praised the "standout" performances of Josie Totah and Mitchell Hoog. "In the wrong hands, the characters of Lexi and Mac Morris could skew towards unlikable, but Totah and Hoog imbue these posh teens with an inherent affability." He also described Higgins’ portrayal of Principal Toddman as "an absolute joy to watch." In his review forTVLine, Dave Nemetz gave the series a B+ grade, calling it "surprisingly good" and "a cleverly constructed, highly tongue-in-cheek reinvention that pokes plenty of fun at its inspiration while finding genuine laughs of its own."

Alan Sepinwall of Rolling Stone described the series as a "clever recontextualization by Wigfield, acknowledging that some of the antics that seemed adorable in the Nineties were actually awful". He thought that it was "a bold choice not only to treat Zack as an outright villain, but to cast his doppelganger of a son in the same light" but on the other hand, being the series also addressed to the original fans, it wasn't "the safest choice to rub their noses in Zack having been a monster all along." He praised Totah's "very funny and utterly natural" performance but noted that "the grand unified field theory behind what Wigfield's attempting makes more sense than, say, the weird blend of sitcom antics, soap plot-twists, and faux documentary realism of the short-lived BH90210, but it doesn't quite hang together." Samantha David-Friedman of Attractions Magazine appreciated the "always-hilarious" John Michael Higgins and noted how the show, despite being a comedy, addressed "more complicated issues like financial disparity, racial profiling, and the complex social challenges faced by modern teens." She described the series as "the perfect mix of new and old" and that "the only thing missing so far" was Screech. Margaret Lyons of The New York Times appreciated the "quick and funny" series and the "strong performances from the new cast" but criticized "the moments of friction [...] from the adult characters grafted in from the original". She called Zack and Kelly "vacuous and awful" but commended the overall product as a "good" and "wholesome revival".

Alex Maidy of JoBlo.com was more negative in his review, giving it a 4 out of 10 vote and describing it as "one of the worst shows of 2020." Maidy criticized the series for not having "idea who its target audience is" and for being "poorly written", although he highlighted the "decent cast" and described the roles of Daisy, Aisha and Devante as "far more interesting characters than they deserve to be." 
Also negative was Charles Bramesco's review for The Guardian, who disliked the work of the "pretty bad [young] actors" and criticized the "laziness" of the writing ("About every third joke lands, and that's a generous estimate"). He recognized that Wigfield had "good sense to realize that a show set at a moneyed SoCal high school cannot avoid the question of income inequality and how it trickles down into the public education system" and that the project "needed a justification for its own existence beyond nostalgia for the first Bush administration, and notwithstanding its many other flaws, Wigfield has smartly managed that much." He gave the show a 2 out of 5 rating and added that "the relative praise of 'for a Saved by the Bell reboot, it's pretty good!' has been fairly earned.  Still, a show about the subtle patronization of lowered expectations shouldn't be aspiring to little more than exactly that." Jamie Jirak of Comicbook appreciated the episodes and called the series a "perfect blend of laughs, nostalgia, and social awareness". She also described the series as "the best attempt at reviving a sitcom we've seen" and added that it was "absolutely worth a Peacock subscription." She praised the "excellent use of A.C. Slater and Jessie Spano", the cast's "great work" and the "solid writing."
 Angela Henderson-Bentley of The Herald-Dispatch found the show to be more intense than the original: "This is not the same Bell, nor does it even try to be. And I honestly think that's why it works. There are lessons at the end of each half-hour, only now they feel much deeper and more important than they did in the 1990s." The Detroit News’ Adam Graham gave the series a B score and defined the "progressive" show as "a throwback that looks forward, embracing the past while living in the now" able to show "that you can teach the old school some new tricks." He also appreciated the art direction ("the set is lovingly recreated in sharp detail").

Rob Owen of the Pittsburgh Tribune-Review felt that tonally, "the new Bell rings cheekier and more meta than any previous iteration" but that "Daisy's tendency to break the fourth wall to confer with viewers produces some chuckles, but after a while the gimmick wears thin." He praised Josie Totah's performance ("she steals focus in every Bell scene she's in) and dubbed her "the most original element" in the show. Having seen only three episodes, Owen added: "More writing like [Totah's lines] and this Bell might be worth saving". Candice Frederick of TV Guide gave it a 2.5/5 score in her mixed review. She described the updated versions of the original characters as "funny" (dubbing Elizabeth Berkley's Jessie as "smart and ambitious") but found it hard to understand if the show was aimed for the original fans, for the new generation, or if it was just a satire of itself. "If it's all of those things, Saved by the Bell is having way too much fun to make any of these statements very well." Judy Berman of Time'' approved Velazquez' "effervescent" performance and descrived Totah as "the strongest performer in the franchise" but wasn't convinced by Wigfield's too "pessimistic depictions of systemic inequality" pushed to "the verge of [triviality]" and ultimately dubbed the show "a punchy, intermittently inspired, well-intentioned mishmash".

The second season has a 100% approval rating on Rotten Tomatoes, with an average score of 8.2/10 based on 5 reviews.

Controversy
The series sparked controversy over its references to Selena Gomez's 2017 kidney transplant. In the series' sixth episode "Teen-Line", two jokes were made regarding the identity of the artist's kidney donor (who was in fact her close friend, Francia Raisa). The jokes drew backlash from fans, who perceived them as offensive and disrespectful; the phrase "Respect Selena Gomez" trended on Twitter. Peacock, Universal Television, and the show's executive producers subsequently issued a statement, "We apologize. It was never our intention to make light of [Gomez]'s health. We have been in touch with her team and will be making a donation to her charity, The Selena Gomez Fund for Lupus Research at USC." The scenes were subsequently removed from the show by Peacock.

Accolades

References

External links
 

2020 American television series debuts
2021 American television series endings
2020s American high school television series
2020s American teen sitcoms
2020s American LGBT-related comedy television series
American LGBT-related sitcoms
American sequel television series
English-language television shows
Peacock (streaming service) original programming
Saved by the Bell
Television series about teenagers
Television series by Universal Television
Television series set in the 2020s
Television shows set in Los Angeles
Television productions postponed due to the COVID-19 pandemic
Transgender-related television shows